Baldwin Locomotive Works 26 is an 0-6-0 "Switcher" type steam locomotive, it is one of several "stock" switchers equipped with a slope-backed tender. It is currently a part of the operating fleet at the Steamtown National Historic Site in Scranton, Pennsylvania for use on excursion trains.

History

Revenue service
The engine was built by the Baldwin Locomotive Works in March 1929. During the first nineteen years of its existence, the engine worked at the Baldwin Locomotive Works plant in Eddystone, Pennsylvania. Painted in Baldwin's standard olive green with aluminum trim and lettering livery, the engine labored hauling raw materials and completed locomotives around the plant with at least two other identical sister locomotives (numbers 21 and 24). Other locomotives of this design were built for the Atlantic Coast Line Railroad, Lehigh and New England Railroad, and General Steel Castings.

Following the end of World War II, the locomotive was purchased by the Jackson Iron and Steel Company of Jackson, Ohio, becoming their number 3 in 1948. While working at JI&S, the locomotive's career is relatively unknown, but the locomotive's career is known to have lasted unusually late for a steam locomotive in revenue service, before being retired in the 1970s. In 1979, the locomotive was purchased by Jerry Jacobson who saved the locomotive from scrap.

Preservation
In 1983, Jacobson had the locomotive moved from Jackson, first to Grand Rapids, Ohio, then to the Mad River & NKP Railroad Museum in Bellevue, Ohio where it was painted as Nickel Plate Road 17. Three years later in 1986, Jacobson traded the switcher with the Steamtown Foundation of Scranton, Pennsylvania for their ex Canadian National 4-6-0 No. 1551. Later that same year, Steamtown was taken over by the National Park Service becoming Steamtown National Historic Site. The locomotive remained in Bellevue, Ohio while the Steamtown Foundation transferred its collection to the National Park Service, it eventually arrived on Steamtown property in January 1990. Upon arrival, would enter Steamtown shops for a complete restoration, it was painted black with white lettering albeit in the same style as her original Baldwin Locomotive Works livery. Upon returning to operation, it began its first excursion runs in the summer of 1990.

Excursion service
Prior to the official opening of Steamtown National Historic Site, the engine frequently ferried passengers between the temporary visitors center and the former Delaware, Lackawanna and Western Railroad roundhouse and turntable complex then undergoing renovations to become the permanent visitors center, museum, and locomotive storage and servicing facility for the park. Following the completion of the museum complex in June 1995, No. 26 ceremonially "cut" a ribbon laid across one of the yard tracks during the official opening ceremony.

Following the official opening of the park, the locomotive became the primary power on Steamtown's short Scranton Limited trains between the museum complex and just beyond the former DL&W Scranton station. She also ran the "Nay Aug Gorge Limited", which travels past the former DL&W Scranton station, and stops on the outskirts of the city just before the Nay Aug tunnel at Nay Aug Park. She also occasionally ran trips to Carbondale, Pennsylvania. In December 1999, No. 26 made its final runs for Steamtown and was taken out of service indefinitely for its FRA-mandated 5-year inspection, while in the shops, it was discovered that the entire inner firebox, and portions of the boiler were in imminent need of replacement. Park management decided to rebuild the engine and the locomotive was completely disassembled. During the disassembly process, it was discovered that the locomotive's frame was bent.

The ensuing overhaul, which lasted seventeen years, saw the rebuilding of the locomotive's running gear, replacement of the firebox, straightening of the frame, re-boring of the cylinders, and other various preventative maintenance. The engine's overhaul was completed in late 2015 and made a successful test run on December 10, 2015. It made its official excursion service return on April 17, 2016. Following its return to service, No. 26 resumed its position as power on the Scranton Limited and “Nay Aug Gorge Limited” yard shuttles.

References

External links 

Baldwin locomotives
0-6-0 locomotives
Individual locomotives of the United States
Preserved steam locomotives of Pennsylvania